Paracles ubiana is a moth of the subfamily Arctiinae first described by Herbert Druce in 1898. It is found in Panama.

References

Moths described in 1898
Paracles